Deputy Chief Brenda Leigh Johnson (portrayed by Kyra Sedgwick) is a fictional character and the main protagonist featured in TNT's The Closer.  She heads the Major Crimes Division (formerly the Priority Homicide Division) of the Los Angeles Police Department.  She is portrayed as an intelligent, determined, and exacting woman. The character has a tendency to offend coworkers and other people involved in her cases but is skilled at determining the facts of a crime, compelling confessions, and closing cases.  Thus, she is "a closer."

For portraying Brenda, Sedgwick earned seven consecutive nominations for Golden Globe Award for Best Actress – Television Series Drama (winning once), five consecutive nominations for the Primetime Emmy Award for Outstanding Lead Actress in a Drama Series (winning once), and seven consecutive nominations for Screen Actors Guild Award for Outstanding Performance by a Female Actor in a Drama Series.

Biographical 
Brenda's parents are Clay and Willie Rae Johnson. Her father was a career officer in the U.S. Air Force. She and her three brothers grew up traveling from base to base with their father. Her parents were both Southerners who retired to Atlanta. Brenda graduated from Georgetown University. She spent seven years with the Central Intelligence Agency, four years with the Metropolitan Police Department of the District of Columbia (MPD), and three and a half years with the Atlanta Police Department before moving to the LAPD. 

During season two, Brenda celebrated her 40th birthday.

Washington, D.C. 
While living in Washington, D.C., Brenda was trained as an interrogator by the CIA.  After joining the MPD, she became involved with her married boss, Will Pope. After refusing to leave his wife, Pope broke up with Brenda. However, he later divorced that wife to marry his next wife, Estelle. During this time, Brenda also met Fritz Howard, an FBI agent then working in D.C. who transferred to Los Angeles 3½ years before the show began. Thus, Fritz left D.C. for L.A. slightly before Brenda left D.C. for Atlanta.  Fritz knew about Brenda and Pope's relationship in D.C. The members of her division in L.A. do not learn of the relationship until Pope and Estelle divorce, which causes Estelle to confront Brenda in front of her entire division, accusing Brenda of wanting to sleep with Pope "again".

Atlanta, Georgia 
Next, Brenda was a captain with the Atlanta Police Department. Her then-husband made false allegations of her having had an affair with a younger police officer, which resulted in an ethics investigation while she was a member of the APD.  Brenda believed that her husband did this because he was jealous of the time she dedicated to her work. The marriage was difficult, and they divorced soon afterward:

After being cleared of the ethics violation, Brenda sought a new job.  She was offered a position with Homeland Security but declined the offer so that she could head the LAPD's new Priority Homicide Division.

Los Angeles, California
Brenda's friend (and former lover) Assistant Chief Will Pope was responsible for her coming to the LAPD and is again her boss.  His motivation in wanting her for the job was that the squad failed to provide cases the prosecutors could win.

During her first case, Brenda is told that she will not be able to obtain DNA results from the LAPD for many weeks, so she contacts associates at the FBI. Fritz notices that the results are for Brenda and personally delivers them. Brenda and Fritz later become involved and eventually marry.

The renaming of the Priority Homicide Division (formerly the Priority Murder Squad which was changed because the initials on the letterhead read 'PMS', which Brenda deemed inappropriate) happened in the middle of the fourth season and was made because as a part of the Major Crimes Division, PHD coincides with an expansion of the types of crime investigated by the division, from only sensitive, high-publicity murder cases to those including rapes and robberies (and potentially other types of crime).

In 2012, Deputy Chief Johnson retired from the LAPD and took a job as Chief of the Los Angeles County District Attorney Bureau of Investigation. According to her husband in season 3 of Major Crimes, she has been offered a very good job in Washington, DC but at the time hadn't decided whether to accept it. Fritz later took a job as Deputy Chief of the LAPD's Special Operations Bureau, and it is unknown how this affects their marriage or her career opportunity. Fritz states at one point that if Brenda takes the job it will be "a bit of a juggling act" but he believes they can make it work. Assistant Chief Taylor also believes the two can make a long-distance relationship work. Brenda is also unaware of the fact that her husband had a heart attack and now requires a pacemaker.

Following the return of Phillip Stroh to Los Angeles in season 6 of Major Crimes, Brenda is given police protection alongside everyone else Stroh is likely to target. She is still married to Fritz and appears to have remained in Los Angeles rather than taking the Washington, DC job. Following Stroh's death at the hands of Rusty Beck at the end of Major Crimes, Brenda is mentioned by Fritz to be having a hard time processing the news that her greatest nemesis is truly gone.

Work life

Habits 
Brenda's trademark is her "honeyed Georgia cadence", and her catchphrase is, "Thank you; thank you so much" (usually said out of ingrained politeness to her coworkers but just as usually said in an exaggerated or somewhat sarcastic tone to suspects or other outsiders). If she cannot arrest and convict a criminal then she will visit other avenues to bring them to what she considers justice -- such as having them imprisoned in a foreign jail or leaking certain details to third parties to get the accused killed. Although she largely gets away with this unethical and dangerous conduct in earlier seasons (Pope and her squad either cannot or will not challenge her on it), it eventually lands her in trouble.

An extreme workaholic who routinely focuses on her cases to the exclusion of everything else around her, a habit that frequently clashes with her professional and personal lives and relationships, she tends to micromanage her investigations and closely examine details. She loves junk food and sweets, especially Ding Dongs, but tries to reduce that dependency. She often hides all types of junk food in drawers, purses, and other places. She is also a "bit of a slob", commenting in one episode that she does not get around to housework every day. In another episode, during a small argument with Fritz over where her mail is, Fritz comments that if she looked at her mail daily instead of once a week, she would know where they keep it.

Her character also seems to be shy of change, perhaps due to her previous bad relationships. She is initially wary of Fritz's moving in with her and even more reticent when they talk about buying a house together, but Fritz uses desperate measures to convince her. She also often adheres to traditional values, and is overwhelmed when Fritz talks of having children after her pregnancy scare in season 2, because "they aren't married yet, and there's a certain order to things." She speaks of wanting to protect against future unplanned pregnancies for the same reasons. When Fritz proposes, she accepts with no hesitation.

Problems (Professional, Personal, and Health) 
When Brenda starts leading the Priority Homicide Division, the squad gives her a cold reception.  En masse they apply for a transfer in support of the former head of the division, then-Captain, now-Commander Taylor.  She dismisses the lack of acceptance and throws their applications into the trash can in front of them.  Her peers in the department are also resentful of the rank she was given when she joined the LAPD.  Compounding this, Brenda alienates the FBI and the L.A. District Attorney's office. However, she earns Taylor's respect by solving the murder of his family friend's son.

Brenda is attacked in an early episode in season one while investigating a victim's house. The principal suspect attacks Brenda, whom he mistakes for the victim, who had supposedly posted a message online saying that she wanted to be raped. Brenda gets to her gun in time and avoids an assault, though she suffers some physical injury and is badly shaken. Following a call from Fritz, during which she struggles to disguise how much the incident has upset her, Fritz shows up at Parker Center to take Brenda home and take care of her for the night, an early sign of his strong feelings for her.

Pope divorce proceedings
Chief Pope and his estranged second wife, Estelle, eventually divorce. While undergoing divorce proceedings, Pope asks Brenda to go through a deposition at his custody hearing. She agrees. Pope gains custody of his children. Estelle, furious at Brenda for her deposition, forces her way to the Squad Room and yells at Brenda, in front of everyone, that "she'd better not find out that she is sleeping with Pope again". Everyone present in the squad room, including Commander Taylor, learns that Brenda had an affair with Pope. They ask the inevitable question, "was she transferred here and given such a high rank due to her relationship with Pope?" Brenda is embarrassed and refuses to talk about the subject. Commander Taylor later makes a statement in front of the entire squad, discredits what Estelle said, and states that Brenda was falsely accused. Brenda later gathers all the pictures and memories of her past relationship with Pope and throws them out in the office trash.

Parker Center shooting and administrative leave
Near the end of season two, Brenda is put on administrative leave (with pay) because of a shooting that occurred in Parker Center.  While investigating the death of a former mob hitman's wife and an FBI agent, she realizes that the hitman (a mob informant for the FBI) killed his wife when he learned she had an abortion.  The hitman and his wife had been in FBI protective custody at the time.  However, unknown to him, another FBI agent had helped the hitman's wife go to a doctor to have an abortion.  When the hitman discovers this, he fatally shoots the FBI agent in question in the murder room by grabbing Detective Lt. Provenza's gun out of his desk and taking him hostage.  During the resulting standoff, Det. Sanchez shoots the mob informant four times, fatally wounding him.

While Brenda is on administrative leave, her squad is taken over (and basically dismantled) by Commander Taylor, a character with whom she has had a difficult and quarrelsome relationship. She is contacted by an old CIA "friend" (played by veteran actor William Daniels) to investigate (secretly) the death of an Arab teenager, due to potential links to terrorism and a possible traitor within the CIA.  She solves the case and recovers her squad.

Brenda is wary of her very Southern and traditional parents finding out about her living with Fritz. One way that this is shown is by her and Fritz maintaining separate phone lines. In season 2, when Brenda's mother comes to visit, Fritz is forced to wait until her mother leaves before he can move in with Brenda, and both have to constantly hide their relationship. Finally, as Brenda's mom is about to leave, she reveals that she knows of the relationship and approves, but won't reveal it to Brenda's father. In season 3, Fritz accidentally picks up the wrong phone and ends up talking to Brenda's father. Brenda is furious and fearful of her dad's reaction, especially because he will not talk to her and says that he sent a letter. Brenda mentions that the last time she got a letter from her father was when she got a B in college. Her character responds emotionally when she finds out that her dad's letter is of forgiveness and happiness for her, not anger.

Medical history
In the third season, it is revealed that Brenda is ill, which alarms her squad and Fritz. Her symptoms include hot flashes, mood swings, nausea, cramps, and dizziness. Her cases and her reluctance keep her from seeing a doctor immediately, despite Fritz's attempts to make her go. Finally seeing a doctor, she is given a preliminary diagnosis of menopause. In the emotional upheaval that follows, Fritz proposes marriage. The following episode reveals that she actually suffers from Polycystic Ovarian Syndrome, so she undergoes more tests to ensure that it is not cancer. Finally, she is told that her condition is reversible by means of ovarian drilling and that she will be able to have children, much to the excitement of her parents, her mother in particular.

Brenda is also attacked with a cattle prod in the third season and held captive, escaping after she shoots the suspect. In the next episode, the department psychologist deems her unfit for active duty after Brenda shows no concern about her attack, her parents' impending visit, her and Fritz's recent engagement, their search for a house, and her medical problems. In that same episode, she is caught in the crossfire of an assassination of an investigative journalist. The journalist is killed and his cameraman badly injured, but Brenda and Sgt. Gabriel escape relatively unscathed. After cornering the shooter in an elevator for a confession, Brenda finally accepts that she's not alright. She returns to work by the time of the next episode.

Stroh Case: Brenda's unclosed investigation
By the end of season four (episode 4.13: "Power of Attorney"), Major Crimes Division is investigating a murder linked to six counts of rape. On their hands, they have Chris Dunlap, a thirty-something-year-old who was found hiding in a tree on the night of the murder. When Brenda nearly gets a confession, she is interrupted by the arrival of Dunlap's attorney, Phillip Stroh (Billy Burke). After being caught in several of Stroh's tricks, such as being forced to open up her case to him by Deputy District Attorney Martin Garnett, Brenda gets Dunlap to confess to being the accomplice in the rapes. When she learns that Dunlap never participated in the crime and asks him who was committing the crimes, she is shocked that he accuses his lawyer, Phillip Stroh. Brenda is outsmarted by the clever attorney and doesn't get a confession from him; moreover, the warrant put on Stroh's home serves no good leads, leaving the case open.

When Brenda becomes overly obsessed with her only unclosed investigation, she starts to have terrifying nightmares of Stroh breaking into her apartment and attacking her, (episode 5.8: "Elysian Fields"). Brenda's free time is committed to solving the case on her own, which crosses over into the time that Fritz would like to spend with her.

In the series finale, episode 7.21 titled "The Last Word" (2012), two men trysting in a secluded park witness a masked man carrying a naked woman's body and flee the scene.  The culprit chases and struggles with one of them (teenaged survival sex prostitute Rusty Beck), who pulls off the culprit's mask and uses his john's cellphone to dial 911 to report the crime.  Brenda and her team find the body and use the clues found at the serial killer's burial ground and through the phone call to track down the two witnesses and tentatively identify the culprit as Stroh.  To positively identify Stroh and close her final case, however, Brenda must employ non-traditional means that cost her her job and come close to costing Beck and Brenda their lives. Brenda lures Stroh to reveal himself by publicizing in the media pictures of Beck wearing the serial killer's mask as a hat and phoning 911, along with the audio and transcripts of that call.  Stroh takes the bait, approaching Beck on the street, and is hauled into an investigation with MCD. There, Brenda threatens that she has his DNA, and Stroh, revealing he closely follows every detail of her life, taunts Brenda about her mother's recent death.  Brenda attacks him, drawing blood and skin fragments that she and her friend at the DA's office convince the crime lab to match against DNA taken from Stroh's mask.  That evening, when Fritz has left for Washington, D.C., to expedite the case, Stroh breaks into Brenda's house, holds Beck at knifepoint, and attacks Brenda.  Brenda shoots him, but - although tempted as well as urged by Beck to kill Stroh - she is haunted by memories of the Turrell Baylor case and her own conscience and calls an ambulance, instead.  Stroh offers a confession, but Brenda uncharacteristically does not want to hear it.  This reflects a new kind of "closer", reflecting that she has learned from her mother's death and from Beck's comments and the life story and must instead focus on the living, not the dead.

The Stroh case continues to affect her old squad through Major Crimes, focusing on Stroh's efforts to stop Rusty Beck from testifying against him. While his efforts to have another serial killer kill Beck fail with some help from Fritz and the FBI, Stroh eventually escapes and is on the loose again. After Stroh apparently returns in late season 6, Brenda is stated to be put under police protection in "Sanctuary City, Part 1" due to Stroh likely killing again. In "Sanctuary City, Part 2", DDA Hobbs states that due to the lengths Brenda went to take Stroh down, if his trial resumes, her testimony could be considered prejudicial and Rusty Beck's testimony holds greater importance in the trial as a result. In "Conspiracy Theory, Part 4," its confirmed that Stroh has indeed returned and resumed his killing spree. Brenda remains under police protection with her protected state being part of a staged argument by her former squad for Stroh and his accomplice in "By Any Means, Part 3." In "By Any Means, Part 4," Stroh is finally killed by Rusty Beck, though Provenza takes credit for it to protect the young man. After Stroh's death, Fritz tells Rusty that Brenda is having a hard time processing the news that Stroh is finally gone.

Personality and idiosyncrasies 
 Brenda's favorite drink is a "big glass of Merlot". (Episode 1:2: "About Face")
 Brenda got her house and cat from a murder victim whose case she solved. The cat, named Kitty, is female although Brenda always refers to Kitty with male pronouns (he, him, etc.) because she thought the cat was male until she gave birth to kittens. Kitty is euthanised in the season 5 episode 3, because of old age and health problems, and Brenda is very upset over her death.  Fritz gets Brenda a kitten named Joel at the end of season 5; ironically, now that she actually has a male cat, Brenda occasionally refers to Joel as "she".
 Brenda speaks "German, Russian, and [is] fully conversant in Czech" (although she is never heard conversing in any of these languages onscreen) but does not speak Spanish. Thus she feels somewhat at a disadvantage in Los Angeles.
 Brenda loves junk food and sweets and hides all types of junk food in drawers, purses, and other places. One of her favorite sweets is the old-fashioned tin-foil-wrapped Ding Dongs by Hostess.

Awards and decorations
The following are the medals and service awards fictionally worn by Deputy Chief Johnson.

References

External links
TNT's Official The Closer Web site

The Closer characters
American female characters in television
Fictional characters from Atlanta
Television characters introduced in 2005
Fictional Atlanta Police Department officers
Fictional Central Intelligence Agency personnel
Fictional Los Angeles Police Department officers